{{DISPLAYTITLE:C20H32}}
The molecular formula C20H32 (molar mass: 272.47 g/mol) may refer to:

 β-Araneosene, a diterpene
 Cembrene A, a diterpene
 Elisabethatriene, a bicyclic compound
 Laurenene, a diterpene
 Sclarene, a diterpene
 Stemarene, a diterpene
 Stemodene, a diterpene
 Taxadiene, a taxane diterpene